Penn Township is the name of some places in the U.S. state of Pennsylvania:

 Penn Township, Berks County, Pennsylvania
 Penn Township, Butler County, Pennsylvania
 Penn Township, Centre County, Pennsylvania
 Penn Township, Chester County, Pennsylvania
 Penn Township, Clearfield County, Pennsylvania
 Penn Township, Cumberland County, Pennsylvania
 Penn Township, Huntingdon County, Pennsylvania
 Penn Township, Lancaster County, Pennsylvania
 Penn Township, Lycoming County, Pennsylvania
 Penn Township, Perry County, Pennsylvania
 Penn Township, Snyder County, Pennsylvania
 Penn Township, Westmoreland County, Pennsylvania
 Penn Township, York County, Pennsylvania
 Penn Township, Philadelphia County, Pennsylvania, defunct, now part of Philadelphia

See also 
 Pennsbury Township, Chester County, Pennsylvania 
 East Penn Township, Carbon County, Pennsylvania
 West Penn Township, Schuylkill County, Pennsylvania
 Penn Forest Township, Carbon County, Pennsylvania
 Penn Hills Township, Allegheny County, Pennsylvania

Pennsylvania township disambiguation pages